This is a list of 924 species in Hydraena, a genus of minute moss beetles in the family Hydraenidae.

Hydraena species

 Hydraena abbasigili Jäch, 1988 i c g
 Hydraena abdita Orchymont, 1948 i c g
 Hydraena abyssinica Régimbart, 1905 i c g
 Hydraena accurata Orchymont, 1948 i c g
 Hydraena achaica Jäch, 1995 i c g
 Hydraena acumena Perkins, 2011 i c g
 Hydraena adelbertensis Perkins, 2011 i c g
 Hydraena adrastea Orchymont, 1948 i c g
 Hydraena aethaliensis Breit, 1917 i c g
 Hydraena affirmata Perkins, 2007 i c g
 Hydraena affusa Orchymont, 1936 i c g
 Hydraena africana Kuwert, 1888 i c g
 Hydraena akameku Perkins, 2011 i c g
 Hydraena akbesiana Audisio, De Biase and Jäch, 1993 i c g
 Hydraena albai Sáinz-Cantero, 1993 i c g
 Hydraena alberti Balfour-Browne, 1950 i c g
 Hydraena alcantarana Ienistea, 1985 i c g
 Hydraena algerina Kaddouri, 1992 i c g
 Hydraena alia Orchymont, 1934 i c g
 Hydraena aliciae Jäch and Díaz, 2005 i c g
 Hydraena allomorpha Lagar and Fresneda, 1990 i c g
 Hydraena alluaudi Régimbart, 1906 i c g
 Hydraena alpicola Pretner, 1931 i c g
 Hydraena altamirensis Díaz Pazos and Garrido Gonzalez, 1993 i c g
 Hydraena altapapua Perkins, 2011 i c g
 Hydraena alternata Perkins, 1980 i c g
 Hydraena alterra Perkins, 1980 i c g
 Hydraena alticola Skale and Jäch, 2008 i c g
 Hydraena altiphila Perkins, 2011 i c g
 Hydraena amazonica Perkins, 2011 i c g
 Hydraena ambiflagellata Zwick, 1977 i c g
 Hydraena ambigua Ganglbauer, 1901 i c g
 Hydraena ambiosina Perkins, 2007 i c g
 Hydraena ambra Perkins, 2011 i c g
 Hydraena ambripes Perkins, 2011 i c g
 Hydraena ambroides Perkins, 2011 i c g
 Hydraena americana Jäch, 1993 i c g
 Hydraena amidensis Jäch, 1988 i c g
 Hydraena ampla Perkins, 2011 i c g
 Hydraena anaphora Perkins, 1980 i c g
 Hydraena anatolica Janssens, 1963 i c
 Hydraena ancylis Perkins, 1980 i c g
 Hydraena ancyrae Jäch, 1992 i c g
 Hydraena andalusa Lagar and Fresneda, 1990 i c g
 Hydraena andreinii Orchymont, 1934 i c g
 Hydraena angulicollis Notman, 1921 i c g b
 Hydraena angulosa Mulsant, 1844 i c g
 Hydraena angustata Sturm, 1836 i c g
 Hydraena anisonycha Perkins, 1980 i c g
 Hydraena antaria Perkins, 2007 i c g
 Hydraena antiatlantica Jäch, Aguilera and Hernando, 1998 i c g
 Hydraena antiochena Jäch, 1988 i c g
 Hydraena apertista Perkins, 2011 i c g
 Hydraena apexa Perkins, 2011 i c g
 Hydraena appalachicola Perkins, 1980 i c g
 Hydraena appetita Perkins, 2007 i c g
 Hydraena aquila Perkins, 2011 i c g
 Hydraena arabica Balfour-Browne, 1951 i c g
 Hydraena arachthi Ferro and Jäch, 2000 i c g
 Hydraena arcta Perkins, 2007 i c g
 Hydraena arenicola Perkins, 1980 i c g
 Hydraena argutipes Perkins, 1980 i c g
 Hydraena ariana Janssens, 1962 i c g
 Hydraena arizonica Perkins, 1980 i c g
 Hydraena armata Reitter, 1880 i c g
 Hydraena armatura Perkins, 2014 i c g
 Hydraena armeniaca Janssens, 1968 i c g
 Hydraena armipalpis Jäch and Díaz, 2000 i c g
 Hydraena armipes Rey, 1886 i c g
 Hydraena aroensis (Ferro, 1991) i c g
 Hydraena arunensis Skale and Jäch in Jäch and Skale, 2009 i c g
 Hydraena ascensa Perkins, 2007 i c g
 Hydraena assimilis Rey, 1885 i c g
 Hydraena ateneo Freitag, 2013 i c g
 Hydraena athertonica Perkins, 2007 i c g
 Hydraena atrata Desbrochers des Loges, 1891 i c g
 Hydraena atroscintilla Perkins, 2011 i c g
 Hydraena attaleiae Ferro, 1984 i c g
 Hydraena audisioi Jäch, 1992 i c g
 Hydraena aulaarta Perkins, 2011 i c g
 Hydraena aurita Jäch, 1988 i c g
 Hydraena australica Zwick, 1977 i c g
 Hydraena australula Perkins, 2007 i c g
 Hydraena austrobesa Perkins, 2011 i c g
 Hydraena avuncula Jäch, 1988 i c g
 Hydraena bacchusi Perkins, 2011 i c g
 Hydraena bactriana Janssens, 1962 i c g
 Hydraena bakriensis Skale and Jäch, 2011 i c g
 Hydraena balearica Orchymont, 1930 i c g
 Hydraena balfourbrownei Bameul, 1986 i c g
 Hydraena balkei Perkins, 2011 i c g
 Hydraena balli Orchymont, 1940 i c g
 Hydraena barbipes Zwick, 1977 i c g
 Hydraena barricula Perkins, 1980 i c g
 Hydraena barrosi Orchymont, 1934 i c g
 Hydraena bedeli Berthélemy, 1992 i c g
 Hydraena belgica Orchymont, 1930 i c g
 Hydraena beniensis Perkins, 2011 i c g
 Hydraena benjaminus Jäch and Díaz, 2006 i c g
 Hydraena bensae Ganglbauer, 1901 i c g
 Hydraena bergeri (Janssens, 1972) i c g
 Hydraena berthelemyana Jäch, Díaz and Dia in Jäch, Dia and Díaz, 2006 i c g
 Hydraena berytus Jäch, 1986 i c g
 Hydraena beyarslani Jäch, 1988 i c g
 Hydraena bicarina Perkins, 2014 i c g
 Hydraena bicarinova Perkins, 2011 i c g
 Hydraena bicolorata Jäch, 1997 i c g
 Hydraena bicuspidata Ganglbauer, 1901 i c g
 Hydraena bidefensa Perkins, 2007 i c g
 Hydraena bifunda Perkins, 2011 i c g
 Hydraena bihamata Champion, 1920 i c g
 Hydraena biimpressa Perkins, 2007 i c g
 Hydraena billi Zwick, 1977 i c g
 Hydraena bilobata Jäch and Díaz, 1998 i c g
 Hydraena biltoni Jäch and Díaz, 2012 i c g
 Hydraena bimagua Jäch, 1986 i c g
 Hydraena birendra Skale and Jäch in Jäch and Skale, 2009 i c g
 Hydraena biseptosa Perkins, 2014 i c g
 Hydraena bispinosa Pu, 1951 i c g
 Hydraena bisulcata Rey, 1884 i c g
 Hydraena bitruncata Orchymont, 1934 i c g
 Hydraena bituberculata Perkins, 1980 i c g
 Hydraena biundulata Perkins, 2011 i c g
 Hydraena blackburni Zaitzev, 1908 i c g
 Hydraena bodemeyeri Jäch and Díaz, 2001 i c g
 Hydraena boetcheri Orchymont, 1932 i c g
 Hydraena bolivari Orchymont, 1936 i c g
 Hydraena boliviana Perkins, 2011 i c g
 Hydraena bononiensis Binaghi, 1960 i c g
 Hydraena borbonica Fairmaire, 1898 i c g
 Hydraena bosnica Apfelbeck, 1909 i c g
 Hydraena brachymera Orchymont, 1936 i c g
 Hydraena bractea Perkins, 1980 i c g
 Hydraena bractoides Perkins, 1980 i c g
 Hydraena brahmin Perkins, 2011 i c g
 Hydraena breedlovei Perkins, 1980 i c g
 Hydraena brevis Sharp, 1882 i c g
 Hydraena britteni Joy, 1907 i c g
 Hydraena brittoni Zwick, 1977 i c g
 Hydraena bromleyae Jäch, 1986 i c g
 Hydraena browni Perkins, 1980 i c g
 Hydraena bubulla Perkins, 2011 i c g
 Hydraena bulgarica Breit, 1916 i c g
 Hydraena buloba Perkins, 2011 i c g
 Hydraena buquintana Perkins, 2011 i c g
 Hydraena buschietanni Freitag, 2021 i c g
 Hydraena buscintilla Perkins, 2011 i c g
 Hydraena busuanga Freitag and Jäch, 2007 i c g
 Hydraena calcarifera Janssens, 1959 i c g
 Hydraena californica Perkins, 1980 i c g
 Hydraena campbelli Perkins, 1980 i c g
 Hydraena canakcioglui Janssens, 1965 i c g
 Hydraena canticacollis Perkins, 1980 i c g
 Hydraena capacis Perkins, 2007 i c g
 Hydraena capensis Perkins, 2014 i c g
 Hydraena capetribensis Perkins, 2007 i c g
 Hydraena cappadocica Jäch, 1988 i c g
 Hydraena caprivica Perkins, 2014 i c g
 Hydraena capta Orchymont, 1936 i c g
 Hydraena carbonaria Kiesenwetter, 1849 i c g
 Hydraena carica Jäch, 1988 i c g
 Hydraena carinocisiva Perkins, 2011 i c g
 Hydraena carinulata Rey, 1886 i c g
 Hydraena carmellita Perkins, 2011 i c g
 Hydraena carniolica Pretner, 1970 i c g
 Hydraena castanea Deane, 1937 i c g
 Hydraena castanescens Freitag and Jäch, 2007 i c g
 Hydraena cata Orchymont, 1936 i c g
 Hydraena catalonica Fresneda, Aguilera and Hernando, 1994 i c g
 Hydraena catherinae Bameul and Jäch, 2001 i c g
 Hydraena caucasica Kuwert, 1888 i c g
 Hydraena cavifrons Perkins, 2011 i c g
 Hydraena cephalleniaca Jäch, 1985 i c g
 Hydraena cervisophila Jäch, 1992 i c g
 Hydraena challeti Perkins, 2011 i c g
 Hydraena cheesmanae Perkins, 2011 i c g
 Hydraena chenae Pu, 1951 i c g
 Hydraena chersonesica Jäch, Díaz and Przewozny, 2007 i c g
 Hydraena cherylbarrae Perkins, 2011 i c g
 Hydraena chiapa Perkins, 1980 i c g
 Hydraena chiesai Janssens, 1965 i c g
 Hydraena chifengi Jäch and Díaz, 1999 i c g
 Hydraena chobauti Guillebeau, 1896 i c g
 Hydraena christinae Audisio, De Biase and Jäch, 1996 i c g
 Hydraena christoferi Jäch and Díaz, 2005 i c g
 Hydraena ciliciensis Jäch, 1988 i c g
 Hydraena circulata Perkins, 1980 i c g b
 Hydraena cirrata Champion, 1920 i c g
 Hydraena clarinis Perkins, 2011 i c g
 Hydraena claudia Freitag and Jäch, 2007 i c g
 Hydraena clavicula Perkins, 2014 i c g
 Hydraena clavigera Zwick, 1977 i c g
 Hydraena clemens Jäch and Díaz, 2006 i c g
 Hydraena clinodorsa Perkins, 2011 i c g
 Hydraena clystera Perkins, 2011 i c g
 Hydraena cochabamba Perkins, 2011 i c g
 Hydraena colchica Janssens, 1963 i c g
 Hydraena colombiana Perkins, 1980 i c g
 Hydraena colorata Perkins, 2011 i c g
 Hydraena colymba Perkins, 1980 i c g
 Hydraena compressipilis Jäch and Díaz, 1998 i c g
 Hydraena concepcionica Perkins, 2011 i c g
 Hydraena concinna Orchymont, 1932 i c g
 Hydraena confluenta Perkins, 2011 i c g
 Hydraena confusa Pu, 1951 i c g
 Hydraena connexa Orchymont, 1932 i c g
 Hydraena converga Perkins, 2007 i c g
 Hydraena coomani Orchymont, 1932 i c g
 Hydraena cooperi Balfour-Browne, 1954 i c g
 Hydraena cooperoides Perkins, 2014 i c g
 Hydraena copulata Perkins, 2011 i c g
 Hydraena cordata Schaufuss, 1883 i c g
 Hydraena cordiformis Jäch and Díaz, 2000 i c g
 Hydraena cordispina Perkins, 2011 i c g
 Hydraena corinna Orchymont, 1936 i c g
 Hydraena cornelli Jäch and Díaz, 1998 i c g
 Hydraena corrugis Orchymont, 1934 i c g
 Hydraena coryleti Jäch, 1992 i c g
 Hydraena costiniceps Perkins, 1980 i c g
 Hydraena crepidoptera Jäch, 1992 i c g
 Hydraena cristatigena Jäch and Díaz, 2000 i c g
 Hydraena croatica Kuwert, 1888 i c g
 Hydraena cryptostoma Jäch, 1992 i c g
 Hydraena crystallina Perkins, 1980 i c g
 Hydraena cubista Perkins, 2007 i c g
 Hydraena cultrata Perkins, 2007 i c g
 Hydraena cunicula Perkins, 2011 i c g
 Hydraena cunninghamensis Perkins, 2007 i c g
 Hydraena curta Kiesenwetter, 1849 i c g
 Hydraena curtipalpis Jäch and Díaz, 1998 i c g
 Hydraena curvipes Jäch and Díaz, 2012 i c g
 Hydraena curvosa Perkins, 2011 i c g
 Hydraena cuspidicollis Perkins, 1980 i c g
 Hydraena cyclops Jäch and Díaz, 2000 i c g
 Hydraena cygnus Zwick, 1977 i c g
 Hydraena czernohorskyi Müller, 1911 i c g
 Hydraena dalmatina Ganglbauer, 1901 i c g
 Hydraena damascena Pic, 1910 i c g
 Hydraena dariensis Perkins, 2011 i c g
 Hydraena darwini Perkins, 2007 i c g
 Hydraena d-concava Perkins, 2011 i c g
 Hydraena d-destina Perkins, 1980 i c g
 Hydraena debeckeri (Janssens, 1972) i c g
 Hydraena decepta Perkins, 2011 i c g
 Hydraena decipiens Zwick, 1977 i c g
 Hydraena decolor Sainte-Claire Deville, 1903 i c g
 Hydraena decui Spangler, 1980 i c g
 Hydraena delia Balfour-Browne, 1978 i c g
 Hydraena deliquesca Perkins, 2007 i c g
 Hydraena delvasi Delgado and Collantes, 1996 i c g
 Hydraena densa Fauvel, 1883 i c g
 Hydraena dentipalpis Reitter, 1888 i c g
 Hydraena dentipes Germar, 1824 i c g
 Hydraena devillei Ganglbauer, 1901 i c g
 Hydraena devincta Orchymont, 1940 i c g
 Hydraena diadema Perkins, 2011 i c g
 Hydraena diazi Trizzino, Jäch and Ribera in Trizzino, Jäch, Audisio and Rivera, 2011 i c g
 Hydraena diffusa Perkins, 2011 i c g
 Hydraena dilutipes Fairmaire, 1898 i c g
 Hydraena dimorpha Orchymont, 1922 i c g
 Hydraena dinosaurophila Jäch, 1994 i c g
 Hydraena discicollis Fairmaire, 1898 i c g
 Hydraena discreta Ganglbauer, 1904 i c g
 Hydraena disparamera Perkins, 2007 i c g
 Hydraena dochula Skale and Jäch in Jäch and Skale, 2009 i c g
 Hydraena dolichogaster Janssens, 1965 i c g
 Hydraena dorrigoensis Perkins, 2007 i c g
 Hydraena draconisaurati Jäch and Díaz, 2005 i c g
 Hydraena dudgeoni Perkins, 2011 i c g
 Hydraena duodecimata Perkins, 2014 i c g
 Hydraena duohamata Perkins, 2011 i c g
 Hydraena ebriimadli Jäch, 1988 i c g
 Hydraena ecuadormica Perkins, 2011 i c g
 Hydraena egoni Jäch, 1986 i c g
 Hydraena eichleri Orchymont, 1937 i c g
 Hydraena einsteini Perkins, 2011 i c g
 Hydraena elephanta Perkins, 2014 i c g
 Hydraena elisabethae Jäch, 1992 i c g
 Hydraena eliya Jäch, 1982 i c g
 Hydraena emarginata Rey, 1885 i c g
 Hydraena emineae Jäch and Kasapoglu, 2006 i c g
 Hydraena epeirosi Ferro, 1985 i c g
 Hydraena errina Orchymont, 1948 i c g
 Hydraena erythraea Régimbart, 1905 i c g
 Hydraena eryx Orchymont, 1948 i c g
 Hydraena esquinita Brojer and Jäch, 2011 i c g
 Hydraena essentia Perkins, 2011 i c g
 Hydraena eucnemis Janssens, 1970 i c g
 Hydraena evanescens Rey, 1884 i c g
 Hydraena evansi Balfour-Browne, 1945 i c g
 Hydraena exarata Kiesenwetter, 1866 i c g
 Hydraena exasperata Orchymont, 1935 i c g
 Hydraena excisa Kiesenwetter, 1849 i c g
 Hydraena exhalista Perkins, 2011 i c g
 Hydraena exilipes Perkins, 1980 i c g
 Hydraena expedita Skale and Jäch in Jäch and Skale, 2009 i c g
 Hydraena explanata Pic, 1905 i c g
 Hydraena extorris Zwick, 1977 i c g
 Hydraena falcata Jäch, 1992 i c g
 Hydraena farsensis Skale and Jäch, 2011 i c g
 Hydraena fasciata Perkins, 2011 i c g
 Hydraena fascinata Perkins, 2011 i c g
 Hydraena fasciola Perkins, 2011 i c g
 Hydraena fasciolata Perkins, 2011 i c g
 Hydraena fasciopaca Perkins, 2011 i c g
 Hydraena favulosa Perkins, 2014 i c g
 Hydraena fenestella Perkins, 2011 i c g
 Hydraena ferethula Perkins, 2007 i c g
 Hydraena feryi Skale and Jäch, 2011 i c g
 Hydraena feuerborni Orchymont, 1932 i c g
 Hydraena fijiensis Balfour-Browne, 1945 i c g
 Hydraena filum Sahlberg, 1908 i c g
 Hydraena finita Orchymont, 1943 i c g
 Hydraena finki Skale and Jäch in Jäch and Skale, 2009 i c g
 Hydraena finniganensis Perkins, 2007 i c g
 Hydraena fiorii Porta, 1899 i c g
 Hydraena fischeri Schönmann, 1991 i c g
 Hydraena flagella Perkins, 2011 i c g
 Hydraena fluvicola (Perkins, 1980) i c g
 Hydraena foliobba Perkins, 2011 i c g
 Hydraena fontana Orchymont, 1932 i c g
 Hydraena fontiscarsavii (Jäch, 1988) i c g
 Hydraena formosapala Perkins, 2011 i c g
 Hydraena formula Orchymont, 1932 i c g
 Hydraena forticollis Perkins, 2007 i c g
 Hydraena fosterorum Trizzino, Jäch and Ribera in Trizzino, Jäch, Audisio and Rivera, 2011 i c g
 Hydraena franklyni Deler-Hernández and Delgado, 2012 i c g
 Hydraena freitagi Skale and Jäch in Jäch and Skale, 2009 i c g
 Hydraena frenzeli Skale and Jäch, 2008 i c g
 Hydraena fritzi Jäch, 1992 i c g
 Hydraena frondsicola (Perkins, 1980) i c g
 Hydraena funda Perkins, 2011 i c g
 Hydraena fundacta Perkins, 2011 i c g
 Hydraena fundaequalis Perkins, 2007 i c g
 Hydraena fundapta Perkins, 2011 i c g
 Hydraena fundarca Perkins, 2011 i c g
 Hydraena fundata Perkins, 2007 i c g
 Hydraena fundextra Perkins, 2011 i c g
 Hydraena furthi Jäch, 1982 i c g
 Hydraena gaditana Lagar and Fresneda, 1990 i c g
 Hydraena galatica Janssens, 1970 i c g
 Hydraena galea Perkins, 2011 i c g
 Hydraena gavarrensis Jäch, Díaz and Martinoy, 2005 i c g
 Hydraena geminya Perkins, 1980 i c g
 Hydraena genumorpha Perkins, 2014 i c g
 Hydraena georgiadesi Orchymont, 1931 i c g
 Hydraena geraldneuhauseri Jäch and Díaz, 2006 i c g
 Hydraena germaini Orchymont, 1923 i c g
 Hydraena glassmani Jäch, 1986 i c g
 Hydraena gnatella Orchymont, 1945 i c g
 Hydraena gnatelloides Orchymont, 1945 i c g
 Hydraena gracilidelphis Trizzino, Valladares, Garrido and Audisio, 2012 i c g
 Hydraena gracilis Germar, 1824 i c g
 Hydraena graciloides (Jäch, 1988) i c g
 Hydraena grandis Reitter, 1885 i c g
 Hydraena graphica Orchymont, 1931 i c g
 Hydraena grata Orchymont, 1944 i c g
 Hydraena gregalis Orchymont, 1944 i c g
 Hydraena gressa Orchymont, 1944 i c g
 Hydraena griphus Orchymont, 1944 i c g
 Hydraena grouvellei Orchymont, 1923 i c g
 Hydraena grueberi Skale and Jäch in Jäch and Skale, 2009 i c g
 Hydraena guadelupensis Orchymont, 1923 i c g
 Hydraena guangxiensis Jäch and Díaz, 2005 i c g
 Hydraena guatemala Perkins, 1980 i c g
 Hydraena guentheri Jäch, 1992 i c g
 Hydraena guilin Jäch and Díaz, 2005 i c g
 Hydraena gynaephila Jäch, 1997 i c g
 Hydraena habitiva Perkins, 2014 i c g
 Hydraena hainzi Jäch, 1988 i c g
 Hydraena haitensis Perkins, 1980 i c g
 Hydraena hajeki Skale and Jäch, 2011 i c g
 Hydraena hamifera Zwick, 1977 i c g
 Hydraena hansreuteri Jäch and Díaz, 2005 i c g
 Hydraena hayashii Jäch and Díaz, 2012 i c g
 Hydraena helena Orchymont, 1929 i c g
 Hydraena hendrichi Jäch, Díaz and Skale, 2013 i c g
 Hydraena hernandoi Fresneda and Lagar, 1990 i c g
 Hydraena herzogestella Perkins, 2011 i c g
 Hydraena heterogyna Bedel, 1898 i c g
 Hydraena hiekei Jäch, 1992 i c g
 Hydraena hillaryi Skale and Jäch in Jäch and Skale, 2009 i c g
 Hydraena hintoni Perkins, 2011 i c g
 Hydraena hispanica Ganglbauer, 1901 i c g
 Hydraena holdhausi Pretner, 1929 i c g
 Hydraena hornabrooki Perkins, 2011 i c g
 Hydraena hortensis Jäch and Díaz, 2000 i c g
 Hydraena hosiwergi Freitag and Jäch, 2007 i c g
 Hydraena hosseinieorum Bilton and Jäch, 1998 i c g
 Hydraena huangshanensis Jäch and Díaz, 2005 i c g
 Hydraena huitongensis Jäch and Díaz, 2005 i c g
 Hydraena humanica Perkins, 2014 i c g
 Hydraena hunanensis Pu, 1951 i c g
 Hydraena hungarica Rey, 1884 i c g
 Hydraena huonica Perkins, 2011 i c g
 Hydraena hyalina Perkins, 1980 i c g
 Hydraena hynesi Zwick, 1977 i c g
 Hydraena hypipamee Perkins, 2007 i c g
 Hydraena ibalimi Perkins, 2011 i c g
 Hydraena iberica Orchymont, 1936 i c g
 Hydraena idema Perkins, 2011 i c g
 Hydraena iheya Jäch and Díaz, 1999 i c g
 Hydraena ilamensis Skale and Jäch in Jäch and Skale, 2009 i c g
 Hydraena ilica Jäch, 1994 i c g
 Hydraena imbria Jäch and Díaz, 2001 i c g
 Hydraena impala Perkins, 2011 i c g
 Hydraena imperatrix Kniz, 1919 i c g
 Hydraena impercepta Zwick, 1977 i c g
 Hydraena impressicollis Fairmaire, 1898 i c g
 Hydraena inancala Perkins, 2007 i c g
 Hydraena inapicipalpis Pic, 1918 i c g
 Hydraena incisiva Perkins, 2011 i c g
 Hydraena incista Perkins, 2011 i c g
 Hydraena incurva Orchymont, 1932 i c g
 Hydraena indiana Jäch, 1994 i c g
 Hydraena indica Orchymont, 1920 i c g
 Hydraena infoveola Perkins, 2011 i c g
 Hydraena ingens (Perkins, 1980) i c g
 Hydraena inhalista Perkins, 2011 i c g
 Hydraena injectiva Perkins, 2014 i c g
 Hydraena innuda Perkins, 2007 i c g
 Hydraena inopinata Jäch and Díaz, 1998 i c g
 Hydraena inplacopaca Perkins, 2011 i c g
 Hydraena insandalia Perkins, 2011 i c g
 Hydraena insita Orchymont, 1932 i c g
 Hydraena insolita Orchymont, 1932 i c g
 Hydraena insularis Orchymont, 1945 i c g
 Hydraena integra Pretner, 1931 i c g
 Hydraena intensa Perkins, 2011 i c g
 Hydraena intermedia Rosenhauer, 1847 i c g
 Hydraena intraangulata Perkins, 2007 i c g
 Hydraena inusta Orchymont, 1932 i c g
 Hydraena invicta Perkins, 2007 i c g
 Hydraena iriomotensis Jäch and Díaz, 1999 i c g
 Hydraena isabelae Castro and Herrera, 2001 i c g
 Hydraena isolinae Jäch and Díaz, 1998 i c g
 Hydraena ispirensis Kasapoglu, Jäch and Skale, 2010 i c g
 Hydraena iterata Orchymont, 1948 i c g
 Hydraena jacobsoni Orchymont, 1932 i c g
 Hydraena jaechiana (Audisio and De Biase, 1990) i c g
 Hydraena jaegeri Skale and Jäch in Jäch and Skale, 2009 i c g
 Hydraena jailensis Breit, 1917 i c g
 Hydraena janczyki Jäch, 1992 i c g
 Hydraena janeceki Jäch, 1987 i c g
 Hydraena janssensi Nilsson, 2001 i c g
 Hydraena jengi Jäch and Díaz, 1998 i c g
 Hydraena jilanzhui Jäch and Díaz, 2005 i c g
 Hydraena jivaro Perkins, 1980 i c g
 Hydraena johncoltranei Perkins, 2011 i c g
 Hydraena jubilata Perkins, 2011 i c g
 Hydraena kadowakii Jäch and Díaz, 2012 i c g
 Hydraena kakadu Perkins, 2007 i c g
 Hydraena kamitei Jäch and Díaz, 2012 i c g
 Hydraena karinkukolae Jäch, 1989 i c g
 Hydraena karmai Skale and Jäch in Jäch and Skale, 2009 i c g
 Hydraena kasyi Jäch, 1992 i c g
 Hydraena kaufmanni Ganglbauer, 1901 i c g
 Hydraena kellymilleri Perkins, 2011 i c g
 Hydraena khnzoriani Janssens, 1968 i c g
 Hydraena kilimandjarensis Régimbart, 1906 i c g
 Hydraena kitayamai Jäch and Díaz, 2012 i c g
 Hydraena knischi Orchymont, 1928 i c g
 Hydraena kocheri Berthélemy, 1992 i c g
 Hydraena kodadai Freitag and Jäch, 2007 i c g
 Hydraena koje Perkins, 2011 i c g
 Hydraena koma Perkins, 2011 i c g
 Hydraena krasnodarensis Jäch and Díaz, 2006 i c g
 Hydraena kroumiriana Kaddouri, 1992 i c g
 Hydraena kucinici Micetic Stankovic and Jäch, 2012 i c g
 Hydraena kuehnelti Jäch, 1989 i c g
 Hydraena kurdistanica Jäch, 1988 i c g
 Hydraena kwangsiensis Pu, 1951 i c g
 Hydraena labropaca Perkins, 2011 i c g
 Hydraena lagamba Brojer and Jäch, 2011 i c g
 Hydraena lapidicola Kiesenwetter, 1849 i c g
 Hydraena lapissectilis Jäch, 1992 i c g
 Hydraena larissae Jäch and Díaz, 2000 i c g
 Hydraena larsoni Perkins, 2007 i c g
 Hydraena lascrucensis Brojer and Jäch, 2011 i c g
 Hydraena lassulipes Perkins, 2011 i c g
 Hydraena latebricola Jäch, 1986 i c g
 Hydraena latisoror Perkins, 2007 i c g
 Hydraena lazica Janssens, 1963 i c g
 Hydraena leechi Perkins, 1980 i c g
 Hydraena leei Jäch and Díaz, 1998 i c g
 Hydraena legorskyi Jäch and Brojer, 2012 i c g
 Hydraena lehmanni Jäch and Díaz, 2005 i c g
 Hydraena leonhardi Breit, 1916 i c g
 Hydraena leprieuri Sainte-Claire Deville, 1905 i c g
 Hydraena levantina Sahlberg, 1908 i c g
 Hydraena ligulipes Jäch, 1988 i c g
 Hydraena lilianae Perkins, 2011 i c g
 Hydraena limbobesa Perkins, 2011 i c g
 Hydraena limpidicollis Perkins, 1980 i c g
 Hydraena liriope Orchymont, 1943 i c g
 Hydraena longicollis Sharp, 1882 i c g
 Hydraena loripes Perkins, 2011 i c g
 Hydraena lotti Bilton, 2013 i c g
 Hydraena lucasi Lagar, 1984 i c g
 Hydraena lucernae Zwick, 1977 i c g
 Hydraena ludovicae Orchymont, 1931 i c g
 Hydraena luminicollis Perkins, 2007 i c g
 Hydraena luridipennis MacLeay, 1873 i c g
 Hydraena lusitana (Berthélemy in Berthélemy and Whytton Da Terra, 1977) i c g
 Hydraena lycia Jäch, 1988 i c g
 Hydraena macedonica Orchymont, 1931 i c g
 Hydraena maculicollis Champion, 1920 i c g
 Hydraena maculopala Perkins, 2011 i c g
 Hydraena madronensis Castor, García and Ferreras, 2000 i c g
 Hydraena magna Pu, 1951 i c g
 Hydraena magnessa Jäch, 1997 i c g
 Hydraena magnetica Zwick, 1977 i c g
 Hydraena mahensis Scott, 1913 i c g
 Hydraena malagricola Jäch and Díaz, 2012 i c g
 Hydraena malickyi Jäch, 1989 i c g
 Hydraena malkini Perkins, 1980 i c g
 Hydraena manabica Perkins, 2011 i c g
 Hydraena manaslu Skale and Jäch in Jäch and Skale, 2009 i c g
 Hydraena manfredjaechi Delgado and Soler, 1991 i c g
 Hydraena manguao Freitag and Jäch, 2007 i c g
 Hydraena manulea Perkins, 2011 i c g
 Hydraena manuloides Perkins, 2011 i c g
 Hydraena marawaka Perkins, 2011 i c g
 Hydraena marcosae Aguilera, Hernando and Ribera, 1997 i c g
 Hydraena marginicollis Kiesenwetter, 1849 i c g
 Hydraena mariannae Jäch, 1992 i c g
 Hydraena marinae Castro, 2003 i c g
 Hydraena martensi Skale and Jäch in Jäch and Skale, 2009 i c g
 Hydraena martinschoepfi Jäch and Díaz, 2005 i c g
 Hydraena masatakai Jäch and Díaz, 2003 i c g
 Hydraena maureenae Perkins, 1980 i c g
 Hydraena mauriciogarciai Perkins, 2011 i c g
 Hydraena mazamitla Perkins, 1980 i c g
 Hydraena mecai Millán and Aguilera, 2000 i c g
 Hydraena melas Dalla Torre, 1877 i c g
 Hydraena mercuriala Perkins, 2011 i c g
 Hydraena meschniggi Pretner, 1929 i c g
 Hydraena metzeni Perkins, 2007 i c g
 Hydraena mexicana Perkins, 1980 i c g
 Hydraena mianminica Perkins, 2011 i c g
 Hydraena michaelbalkei Jäch, Díaz and Skale, 2013 i c g
 Hydraena mignymixys Perkins, 1980 i c g
 Hydraena millerorum Perkins, 2007 i c g
 Hydraena miniretia Perkins, 2007 i c g
 Hydraena mintrita Perkins, 2011 i c g
 Hydraena mitchellensis Perkins, 2007 i c g
 Hydraena miyatakei Satô, 1959 i c g
 Hydraena modili Jäch, 1988 i c g
 Hydraena monikae Jäch and Díaz, 2000 i c g
 Hydraena monscassius Jäch, 1988 i c g
 Hydraena monstruosipes Ferro, 1986 i c g
 Hydraena monteithi Perkins, 2007 i c g
 Hydraena morio Kiesenwetter, 1849 i c g
 Hydraena motzfeldi Skale and Jäch, 2011 i c g
 Hydraena mouzaiensis Sainte-Claire Deville, 1909 i c g
 Hydraena mpumalanga Perkins, 2014 i c g
 Hydraena muelleri Pretner, 1931 i c g
 Hydraena muezziginea Jäch, 1988 i c g
 Hydraena multiloba Perkins, 2011 i c g
 Hydraena multimurata Perkins, 2014 i c g
 Hydraena multispina Perkins, 2011 i c g
 Hydraena mylasae Jäch, 1992 i c g
 Hydraena namibiensis Perkins, 2014 i c g
 Hydraena nanocolorata Perkins, 2011 i c g
 Hydraena nanopala Perkins, 2011 i c g
 Hydraena nanoscintilla Perkins, 2011 i c g
 Hydraena natiforma Perkins, 2014 i c g
 Hydraena neblina Perkins, 2011 i c g
 Hydraena nelsonmandelai Makhan, 2008 i c g
 Hydraena neoaccurata Perkins, 2014 i c g
 Hydraena nevermanni Perkins, 1980 i c g
 Hydraena newtoni Perkins, 1980 i c g
 Hydraena nielshaggei Freitag and Jäch, 2007 i c g
 Hydraena nigra Hatch, 1965 i c g
 Hydraena nigrita Germar, 1824 i c g
 Hydraena nike Jäch, 1995 i c g
 Hydraena nilguenae (Jäch, 1988) i c g
 Hydraena nitidimenta Perkins, 2011 i c g
 Hydraena nivalis Jäch, 1992 i c g
 Hydraena nomenipes Perkins, 2014 i c g
 Hydraena notsui Satô, 1978 i c g
 Hydraena novacula Perkins, 2011 i c g
 Hydraena numidica Sainte-Claire Deville, 1905 i c g
 Hydraena nurabadensis Skale and Jäch, 2011 i c g
 Hydraena nuratauensis Jäch, 1994 i c g
 Hydraena oaxaca Perkins, 1980 i c g
 Hydraena oblio Perkins, 1980 i c g
 Hydraena occidentalis Perkins, 1980 i c g
 Hydraena occitana (Audisio and De Biase, 1995) i c g
 Hydraena okapa Perkins, 2011 i c g
 Hydraena okinawensis Jäch and Díaz, 1999 i c g
 Hydraena olidipastoris Jäch, 1988 i c g
 Hydraena ollopa Perkins, 2011 i c g
 Hydraena optica Jäch and Díaz, 2012 i c g
 Hydraena orchis Jäch and Díaz, 1998 i c g
 Hydraena orcula Perkins, 1980 i c g
 Hydraena ordishi Delgado and Palma, 1997 i c g
 Hydraena orientalis Breit, 1916 i c g
 Hydraena ortali Jäch, 1986 i c g
 Hydraena orthosia Jäch, Díaz and Dia in Jäch, Dia and Díaz, 2006 i c g
 Hydraena otiarca Perkins, 2011 i c g
 Hydraena ovata Janssens, 1961 i c g
 Hydraena owenobesa Perkins, 2011 i c g
 Hydraena oxiana Janssens, 1974 i c g
 Hydraena ozarkensis Perkins, 1980 i c g
 Hydraena pachyptera Apfelbeck, 1909 i c g
 Hydraena pacifica Perkins, 1980 i c g
 Hydraena pacificica Perkins, 2011 i c g
 Hydraena paeminosa Perkins, 1980 i c g
 Hydraena pagaluensis Hernando and Ribera, 2001 i c g
 Hydraena paganettii Ganglbauer, 1901 i c g
 Hydraena pajarita Brojer and Jäch, 2011 i c g
 Hydraena pakistanica Jäch, 1992 i c g
 Hydraena pala Perkins, 2011 i c g
 Hydraena palamita Perkins, 2011 i c g
 Hydraena palawanensis Freitag and Jäch, 2007 i c g
 Hydraena pallidula Sainte-Claire Deville, 1909 i c g
 Hydraena palustris Erichson, 1837 i c g
 Hydraena pamirica Jäch, 1992 i c g
 Hydraena pamphylia Jäch and Díaz, 2001 i c g
 Hydraena pangaei Jäch, 1992 i c g
 Hydraena pantanalensis Perkins, 2011 i c g
 Hydraena paraguayensis Janssens, 1972 i c g
 Hydraena parciplumea Perkins, 2007 i c g
 Hydraena particeps Perkins, 1980 i c g
 Hydraena parva Zwick, 1977 i c g
 Hydraena parysatis Janssens, 1981 i c g
 Hydraena paucistriata Jäch and Díaz, 2000 i c g
 Hydraena paulmoritz Jäch, Díaz and Skale, 2013 i c g
 Hydraena pavicula Perkins, 1980 i c g
 Hydraena paxillipes Perkins, 2011 i c g
 Hydraena peckorum Perkins, 2011 i c g
 Hydraena pectenata Perkins, 2011 i c g
 Hydraena pedroaguilerai Perkins, 2011 i c g
 Hydraena pegopyga Perkins, 2011 i c g
 Hydraena pelops Jäch, 1995 i c g
 Hydraena pennsylvanica Kiesenwetter, 1849 b
 Hydraena pensylvanica Kiesenwetter, 1849 i c g
 Hydraena penultimata Perkins, 2011 i c g
 Hydraena perkinsi Spangler, 1980 i c g
 Hydraena perlonga Balfour-Browne, 1950 i c g
 Hydraena perpunctata Perkins, 2011 i c g
 Hydraena persica Janssens, 1981 i c g
 Hydraena pertransversa Perkins, 2011 i c g
 Hydraena peru Perkins, 1980 i c g
 Hydraena pesici Skale and Jäch, 2011 i c g
 Hydraena petila Perkins, 1980 i c g
 Hydraena phainops Perkins, 2011 i c g
 Hydraena phallerata Orchymont, 1944 i c g
 Hydraena phallica Orchymont, 1930 i c g
 Hydraena phassilyi Orchymont, 1931 i c g
 Hydraena philippi Jäch and Díaz, 2005 i c g
 Hydraena philyra Orchymont, 1944 i c g
 Hydraena phoenicia Jäch, Díaz and Dia in Jäch, Dia and Díaz, 2006 i c g
 Hydraena photogenica Perkins, 2011 i c g
 Hydraena pici Sainte-Claire Deville, 1905 i c g
 Hydraena picula Perkins, 2011 i c g
 Hydraena pilimera Brojer and Jäch, 2011 i c g
 Hydraena pilipes Zwick, 1977 i c g
 Hydraena pilulambra Perkins, 2011 i c g
 Hydraena pindica Janssens, 1965 i c g
 Hydraena pisciforma Perkins, 2014 i c g
 Hydraena planata Kiesenwetter, 1849 i c g
 Hydraena plastica Orchymont, 1943 i c g
 Hydraena platycnemis Jäch, 1988 i c g
 Hydraena platynaspis Jäch, 1988 i c g
 Hydraena platysoma Janssens, 1968 i c g
 Hydraena plaumanni Orchymont, 1937 i c g
 Hydraena plumipes Rey, 1886 i c g
 Hydraena pluralticola Perkins, 2011 i c g
 Hydraena plurifurcata Jäch and Díaz, 1998 i c g
 Hydraena polita Kiesenwetter, 1849 i c g
 Hydraena pontequula Perkins, 1980 i c g
 Hydraena pontica Janssens, 1963 i c g
 Hydraena porchi Perkins, 2007 i c g
 Hydraena porcula Jäch and Díaz, 1998 i c g
 Hydraena praetermissa Jäch, 1987 i c g
 Hydraena premordica Perkins, 1980 i c g
 Hydraena pretneri Chiesa, 1927 i c g
 Hydraena prieto Perkins, 1980 i c g
 Hydraena princeps Fauvel, 1903 i c g
 Hydraena processa Perkins, 2011 i c g
 Hydraena producta Mulsant and Rey, 1852 i c g
 Hydraena proesei Skale and Jäch, 2011 i c g
 Hydraena profunda Perkins, 2014 i c g
 Hydraena prokini Jäch and Díaz, 2006 i c g
 Hydraena propria Perkins, 2011 i c g
 Hydraena prusensis Jäch, 1992 i c g
 Hydraena pseudocirrata Skale and Jäch in Jäch and Skale, 2009 i c g
 Hydraena pseudopalawanensis Freitag and Jäch, 2007 i c g
 Hydraena pseudoriparia Orchymont, 1945 i c g
 Hydraena puetzi Jäch, 1994 i c g
 Hydraena pugillista Perkins, 2007 i c g
 Hydraena pulchella Germar, 1824 i c g
 Hydraena pulsatrix Perkins, 1980 i c g
 Hydraena punctata LeConte, 1855 i c g
 Hydraena puncticollis Sharp, 1882 i c g
 Hydraena punctilata Perkins, 2011 i c g
 Hydraena putearius Jäch and Díaz, 2000 i c g
 Hydraena pygmaea Waterhouse, 1833 i c g
 Hydraena quadrata (Janssens, 1980) i c g
 Hydraena quadricollis Wollaston, 1864 i c g
 Hydraena quadricurvipes Perkins, 1980 i c g
 Hydraena quadriplumipes Perkins, 2011 i c g
 Hydraena quechua Perkins, 1980 i c g
 Hydraena queenslandica Perkins, 2007 i c g
 Hydraena quetiae Castro, 2000 i c g
 Hydraena quilisi Lagar, Fresneda and Fernando, 1987 i c g
 Hydraena quintana Perkins, 2011 i c g
 Hydraena ramuensis Perkins, 2011 i c g
 Hydraena ramuquintana Perez, 2011 i c g
 Hydraena receptiva Perkins, 2011 i c g
 Hydraena reflectiva Perkins, 2014 i c g
 Hydraena regimbarti Zaitzev, 1908 i c g
 Hydraena remulipes Perkins, 2011 i c g
 Hydraena reticulata Zwick, 1977 i c g
 Hydraena reticuloides Perkins, 2007 i c g
 Hydraena reticulositis Perkins, 2007 i c g
 Hydraena revelovela Perkins, 2007 i c g
 Hydraena reverberata Perkins, 2011 i c g
 Hydraena reyi Kuwert, 1888 i c g
 Hydraena rhinoceros (Janssens, 1972) i c g
 Hydraena rhodia Jäch, 1985 i c g
 Hydraena riberai Jäch, Aguilera and Hernando, 1998 i c g
 Hydraena richardimbi Jäch, 1992 i c g
 Hydraena rigua Orchymont, 1931 i c g
 Hydraena ripaeaureae (Janssens, 1972) i c g
 Hydraena riparia Kugelann, 1794 i c g
 Hydraena rivularis Guillebeau, 1896 i c g
 Hydraena robusta Zwick, 1977 i c g
 Hydraena rosannae Audisio, Trizzino and De Biase in Audisio, Trizzino, De Biase, Mancini and Antonini, 2009 i c g
 Hydraena rudallensis Blackburn, 1896 i c g
 Hydraena rufipennis Boscá Berga, 1932 i c g
 Hydraena rufipes Curtis, 1830 i c g
 Hydraena rugosa Mulsant, 1844 i c g
 Hydraena ruinosa Zwick, 1977 i c g
 Hydraena rukiyeae Kasapoglu, Jäch and Skale, 2010 i c g
 Hydraena sabella Perkins, 1980 i c g
 Hydraena saga Orchymont, 1930 i c g
 Hydraena sagatai Perkins, 2011 i c g
 Hydraena sahlbergi Orchymont, 1923 i c g
 Hydraena saluta Perkins, 2011 i c g
 Hydraena samia Jäch, 1986 i c g
 Hydraena samnitica Knisch, 1924 i c g
 Hydraena sanagergelyae Brojer and Jäch, 2011 i c g
 Hydraena sanfilippoi (Audisio and De Biase, 1995) i c g
 Hydraena sappho Janssens, 1965 i c g
 Hydraena sardoa Binaghi, 1961 i c g
 Hydraena satoi Jäch and Díaz, 1999 i c g
 Hydraena sautakei Jäch and Díaz, 1999 i c g
 Hydraena sauteri Orchymont, 1913 i c g
 Hydraena scabra Orchymont, 1925 i c g
 Hydraena scabrosa Orchymont, 1931 i c g
 Hydraena schawalleri Skale and Jäch in Jäch and Skale, 2009 i c g
 Hydraena schilfii Jäch, 1988 i c g
 Hydraena schillhammeri Jäch, 1988 i c g
 Hydraena schmidi Jäch and Díaz, 2001 i c g
 Hydraena schoedli Jäch, 1992 i c g
 Hydraena schoenmanni Jäch, 1988 i c g
 Hydraena schubertorum Jäch and Díaz, 2001 i c g
 Hydraena schuelkei Jäch, 1992 i c g
 Hydraena schuleri Ganglbauer, 1901 i c g
 Hydraena scintilla Perkins, 1980 i c g
 Hydraena scintillabella Perkins, 1980 i c g
 Hydraena scintillamima Perkins, 2011 i c g
 Hydraena scintillapicta Perkins, 2011 i c g
 Hydraena scintillarca Perkins, 2011 i c g
 Hydraena scintillutea Perkins, 1980 i c g
 Hydraena scitula Orchymont, 1943 i c g
 Hydraena scolops Perkins, 1980 i c g
 Hydraena scopula Perkins, 1980 i c g
 Hydraena scythica Janssens, 1974 i c g
 Hydraena sebastiani Perkins, 2014 i c g
 Hydraena sepikramuensis Perkins, 2011 i c g
 Hydraena septemlacuum Jäch, 1992 i c g
 Hydraena serpentina Jäch, 1988 i c g
 Hydraena serricollis Wollaston, 1864 i c g
 Hydraena servilia Orchymont, 1936 i c g
 Hydraena sexarcuata Perkins, 2011 i c g
 Hydraena sexsuprema Perkins, 2011 i c g
 Hydraena sharmai Skale and Jäch in Jäch and Skale, 2009 i c g
 Hydraena sharpi Rey, 1886 i c g
 Hydraena shorti Perkins, 2011 i c g
 Hydraena sicula Kiesenwetter, 1849 i c g
 Hydraena sidon Jäch, Díaz and Dia in Jäch, Dia and Díaz, 2006 i c g
 Hydraena sierra Perkins, 1980 i c g
 Hydraena similis Orchymont, 1930 i c g
 Hydraena simonidea Orchymont, 1931 i c g
 Hydraena simplicicollis Blackburn, 1896 i c g
 Hydraena simplipes Zwick, 1977 i c g
 Hydraena singaporensis Jäch, Díaz and Skale, 2013 i c g
 Hydraena sinope Jäch, 1992 i c g
 Hydraena smyrnensis Sahlberg, 1908 i c g
 Hydraena socius Jäch and Díaz, 1999 i c g
 Hydraena solarii Pretner, 1930 i c g
 Hydraena solodovnikovi Jäch and Díaz, 2006 i c g
 Hydraena sordida Sharp, 1882 i c g
 Hydraena spangleri Perkins, 1980 i c g
 Hydraena spatula Perkins, 2011 i c g
 Hydraena speciosa Orchymont, 1944 i c g
 Hydraena spinipes Baudi, 1882 i c g
 Hydraena spinissima Perkins, 2007 i c g
 Hydraena spinobesa Perkins, 2011 i c g
 Hydraena splecoma Perkins, 1980 i c g
 Hydraena squalida Orchymont, 1932 i c g
 Hydraena stefani Jäch and Díaz, 2005 i c g
 Hydraena steineri Perkins, 2011 i c g
 Hydraena stellula Perkins, 2011 i c g
 Hydraena storeyi Perkins, 2007 i c g
 Hydraena striolata Perkins, 2011 i c g
 Hydraena stussineri Kuwert, 1888 i c g
 Hydraena subacuminata Rey, 1884 i c g
 Hydraena subgrandis Jäch, 1988 i c g
 Hydraena subimpressa Rey, 1885 i c g
 Hydraena subina Orchymont, 1944 i c g
 Hydraena subinflata Orchymont, 1944 i c g
 Hydraena subinoides Orchymont, 1944 i c g
 Hydraena subintegra Ganglbauer, 1901 i c g
 Hydraena subinura Orchymont, 1944 i c g
 Hydraena subirregularis Pic, 1918 i c g
 Hydraena subjuncta Orchymont, 1930 i c g
 Hydraena sublamina Orchymont, 1945 i c g
 Hydraena sublapsa Orchymont, 1945 i c g
 Hydraena subsequens Rey, 1886 i c g
 Hydraena supersexa Perkins, 2011 i c g
 Hydraena supina Perkins, 2011 i c g
 Hydraena szechuanensis Pu, 1951 i c g
 Hydraena takin Skale and Jäch in Jäch and Skale, 2009 i c g
 Hydraena takutu Perkins, 2011 i c g
 Hydraena tarsotricha Perkins, 2011 i c g
 Hydraena tarvisina (Ferro, 1992) i c g
 Hydraena tatii Sáinz-Cantero and Alba-Tercedor, 1989 i c g
 Hydraena tauricola Jäch, 1988 i c g
 Hydraena taxila Janssens, 1962 i c g
 Hydraena tekmanensis Jäch, Skale and Kasapoglu, 2011 i c g
 Hydraena tenjikuana Satô, 1979 i c g
 Hydraena tenuis (Janssens, 1980) i c g
 Hydraena tenuisella Perkins, 2007 i c g
 Hydraena tenuisoror Perkins, 2007 i c g
 Hydraena terebrans Jäch, 1992 i c g
 Hydraena terralta Perkins, 1980 i c g
 Hydraena testacea Curtis, 1830 i c g
 Hydraena tetana Perkins, 2011 i c g
 Hydraena textila Perkins, 2007 i c g
 Hydraena thienemanni Orchymont, 1932 i c g
 Hydraena thola Perkins, 2011 i c g
 Hydraena tholasoris Perkins, 2011 i c g
 Hydraena thumbelina Perkins, 2011 i c g
 Hydraena thumbelipes Perkins, 2011 i c g
 Hydraena thyene Balfour-Browne, 1958 i c g
 Hydraena tiara Perkins, 2014 i c g
 Hydraena tibiopaca Perkins, 2011 i c g
 Hydraena tobogan Perkins, 2011 i c g
 Hydraena torosopala Perkins, 2011 i c g
 Hydraena torricellica Perkins, 2011 i c g
 Hydraena transvallis Perkins, 2011 i c g
 Hydraena trapezoidalis Zwick, 1977 i c g
 Hydraena tricantha Zwick, 1977 i c g
 Hydraena trichotarsa Perkins, 2011 i c g
 Hydraena tricosipes Perkins, 2011 i c g
 Hydraena tridigita Perkins, 2011 i c g
 Hydraena tridisca Perkins, 2007 i c g
 Hydraena triloba Perkins, 2007 i c g
 Hydraena trinidensis Perkins, 1980 i c g
 Hydraena triparamera Jäch, 1982 i c g
 Hydraena tritropis Perkins, 2011 i c g
 Hydraena tritutela Perkins, 2011 i c g
 Hydraena truncata Rey, 1885 i c g
 Hydraena tsushimaensis Jäch and Díaz, 2012 i c g
 Hydraena tubuliphallis Jäch, 1982 i c g
 Hydraena tucumanica Perkins, 1980 i c g
 Hydraena tuolumne Perkins, 1980 i c g
 Hydraena turcica Janssens, 1965 i c g
 Hydraena turrialba Perkins, 1980 i c g
 Hydraena tyrrhena Binaghi, 1961 i c g
 Hydraena ulna Perkins, 2011 i c g
 Hydraena umbolenta Perkins, 2011 i c g
 Hydraena unca Valladares, 1989 i c g
 Hydraena undevigintioctogintasisyphos Jäch and Díaz, 2005 i c g
 Hydraena undulata Jäch and Díaz, 1998 i c g
 Hydraena uniforma Perkins, 2014 i c g
 Hydraena unita Perkins, 2011 i c g
 Hydraena uzbekistanica Jäch, 1994 i c g
 Hydraena vadosa Perkins, 2014 i c g
 Hydraena valentini Jäch and Díaz, 2012 i c g
 Hydraena vandykei Orchymont, 1923 i c g
 Hydraena variopaca Perkins, 2011 i c g
 Hydraena vedrasi Orchymont, 1931 i c g
 Hydraena vela Perkins, 1980 i c g
 Hydraena velvetina Perkins, 2011 i c g
 Hydraena venezuela Perkins, 2011 i c g
 Hydraena verberans Jäch and Díaz, 2006 i c g
 Hydraena verstraeteni Ferro, 1984 i c g
 Hydraena victoriae Jäch and Díaz, 1999 i c g
 Hydraena vietnamensis (Janssens, 1972) i c g
 Hydraena virginalis Janssens, 1963 i c g
 Hydraena vodozi Sainte-Claire Deville, 1908 i c g
 Hydraena vulgaris Jäch and Díaz, 2000 i c g
 Hydraena waldheimi Jäch, 1987 i c g
 Hydraena wangi Jäch and Díaz, 1998 i c g
 Hydraena wangmiaoi Jäch and Díaz, 2005 i c g
 Hydraena watanabei Jäch and Satô, 1988 i c g
 Hydraena wattsi Perkins, 2007 i c g
 Hydraena weigeli Skale and Jäch in Jäch and Skale, 2009 i c g
 Hydraena weiri Perkins, 2007 i c g
 Hydraena wencke Skale and Jäch in Jäch and Skale, 2009 i c g
 Hydraena wewalkai Jäch, 1988 i c g
 Hydraena williamsensis Deane, 1931 i c g
 Hydraena wittmeri Satô, 1979 i c g
 Hydraena wolfi Skale and Jäch in Jäch and Skale, 2009 i c g
 Hydraena wrasei Jäch, 1992 i c g
 Hydraena xingu Perkins, 2011 i c g
 Hydraena yangae Jäch, Díaz and Skale, 2013 i c g
 Hydraena yonaguniensis Jäch and Díaz, 2003 i c g
 Hydraena yosemitensis Perkins, 1980 i c g
 Hydraena yoshitomii Jäch and Díaz, 1999 i c g
 Hydraena youngi Perkins, 1980 i c g
 Hydraena ypsilon Zwick, 1977 i c g
 Hydraena yunnanensis Pu, 1942 i c g
 Hydraena zapatina Perkins, 1980 i c g
 Hydraena zelandica Ordish, 1984 i c g
 Hydraena zetteli Freitag and Jäch, 2007 i c g
 Hydraena zezerensis Díaz Pazos and Bilton, 1995 i c g
 Hydraena zimbabwensis Perkins, 2014 i c g
 Hydraena zwicki Perkins, 2007 i c g

Data sources: i = ITIS, c = Catalogue of Life, g = GBIF, b = Bugguide.net

References

Hydraena